Welt der Physik is a scientific magazine in German language analogous to New Scientist. The magazine was started in 2003. It is based in Hamburg.

References

External links
Official website

2003 establishments in Germany
German-language magazines
Magazines established in 2003
Magazines published in Hamburg
Physics magazines